Denise Soesilo (born May 10, 1987 in Hamburg, West Germany) is a Germanice hockey player. She was forward position. She played for the Yale Bulldogs and was the first Yale women's hockey player to compete in the Olympics, along with her Yale teammate Helen Resor.

Playing career

Germany
She represented Germany in the Germany women's national ice hockey team at the Winter Olympic Games. She competed in the 2006 Olympics.

Career stats

Olympics

NCAA

References

See also
 Germany women's national ice hockey team

1987 births
German women's ice hockey forwards
Ice hockey players at the 2006 Winter Olympics
Living people
Olympic ice hockey players of Germany
Sportspeople from Hamburg
Yale Bulldogs women's ice hockey players